Somaliland is an unrecognised sovereign state in the Horn of Africa, internationally considered to be part of Somalia. 
Somaliland is located in the East African sub-continent between the equator and the Gulf of Aden. The climate is mostly hot and desertlike; it is largely arid with some semi-arid regions.

Land boundaries

To the north of Somaliland is the Gulf of Aden, which borders Somaliland along its only of coastline. In its north-western corner, Somaliland shares a border with Djibouti. Ethiopia borders the country to the west and to the south. Somalia, which claims sovereignty over the territory of Somaliland, lies to the east.

Topography

Somaliland is occupied by three main topographic areas. In the north and northwest, along the Gulf of Aden, lie the coastal plains of the Guban region. The plains are a low region that are, on average, just 500 metres above sea level. The low altitude of the region makes it hot and dry, and it receives little rain throughout the year. The Guban contains the port cities of Berbera and Zeylac. The highlands are cool and wet area in the center of Somaliland that contain a series of mountain ranges. To the west are the Golis Mountains and to the east, the Ogo Mountains. Borama is one of the major cities located in the mountainous region. In the southeast, near the border with Somalia, is a low region of valleys. The valleys are hot and dry, and receive relatively small amounts of rain each year. The average elevation of the area is between 500 and 1000 metres above sea level. Notable cities in the area include Laascaanood, Taleex, and Xudun.

Somaliland Regions
The area of the regions of Somaliland is set out in the table below.

Climate

Somaliland lies north of the Equator and has a dry climate, with most regions designated as arid, with a few, smaller, areas as semi-arid.

The primary rainy season is during the spring, with a secondary, more limited, season in late fall.

Somaliland experiences four seasons of climate. Gu (spring) is the longest wet season, and lasts from late March to early June. The increased rain at this time usually corresponds to abundant water and increased breeding of livestock. Xagaa (summer) is a dry windy season, that typically lasts from June through September. Deyr (fall) is the shorter rainy season which covers late September through November. Jiilaal (winter) is the long dry season which lasts from December until mid-March. Jiilaal is the coolest period of the year in Somaliland, but still brings relatively high amounts of humidity.

Coastline

In February 2017, Somaliland declared a  Exclusive Economic Zone and a 24 nautical mile Contiguous Zone in addition to its claimed territorial waters. Internationally, however, the waters are still recognized as belonging to Somalia.

See also
Somaliland
List of cities in Somaliland

References

 
Afrotropical realm
Deserts and xeric shrublands